The Pro14 Rainbow Cup (also known as the Guinness Pro14 Rainbow Cup for sponsorship reasons) was a professional rugby union end-of-season cup competition played in 2021 that consisted of two separate tournaments: the Rainbow Cup for twelve European clubs and the Rainbow Cup SA for four South African clubs. The winners of each competition then played a final match to determine the overall winner. The tournament operated as a shortened 'Spring season' to allow for the integration of the four new South African teams into the United Rugby Championship ahead of the 2021–22 season.

In winning the play-off final against the Bulls of South Africa, Benetton Treviso became the first Italian side ever to win any of the successor championships to the Celtic League.

Background
The 2020–21 Pro14 was reduced to twelve teams as the two South African teams - the Cheetahs and Southern Kings - were not allowed to travel internationally in 2020 due to the COVID-19 pandemic. In September 2020, the Southern Kings ceased operations and the South African Rugby Union council began exploring the possibility of the four South African former Super Rugby teams - the Bulls, Lions, Sharks and Stormers - joining an expanded Pro14.

PRO14 Rugby announced in December 2020 that the 2020–21 Pro14 regular season would conclude after 16 rounds, and the top team from each conference would advance to a final in March 2021. The Pro14 Rainbow Cup then commenced in April and introduced the four new South African teams.

With South Africa hosting the British & Irish Lions tour in July–August 2021, the tournament also served as a warm-up event for the British, Irish and South African players hoping to be involved in the tour.

Between February and March eight South African franchises played in a "preparation series" also known as the Preparation Series to get valuable game time before the Rainbow Cup.

Due to several issues surrounding travel restrictions as a result of the pandemic, it was announced in April 2021 that the Rainbow Cup would adopt a dual tournament format and there would be no cross-hemisphere fixtures.

Format
The competition format changed several times but eventually consisted of two separate tournaments running side by side. In the northern hemisphere's Rainbow Cup, the 12 Pro14 teams in Europe competed from 23 April until 12 June 2021. There were 6 match weekends over an 8-week period with each team receiving one additional bye week.

In the southern hemisphere's Rainbow Cup SA, each of the four teams played each other twice, a total of six rounds were played between 1 May and 12 June 2021. There was one fallow week in which each team received a bye week.

A final between the best placed Northern and Southern Hemisphere teams followed both tournaments on 19 June.

Law variations
The Rainbow Cup saw three law variations trialled: Replacement for a red carded player after 20 minutes, Captain's Challenge and Goal-line dropouts. The replacement for a red carded player after 20 minutes allowed a side who has had a player sent-off to replace them with one of their named substitutes after a period of 20 minutes. A captain's challenge, similar to appeals used successfully in cricket and tennis, allowed each team to request a television match official review an offence in the build up to a try being scored or an act of foul play, or any referee's decision after the clock passes 75 minutes; where the referee's on-field decision was not changed, that team would no longer be able to challenge a decision thereafter. Goal-line dropouts were used if the ball is held-up over the line, knock-ons that occur in goal or when the ball is grounded by the defending team in the in-goal area after a kick through. All these law variations have previously been trialled in both Super Rugby Aotearoa and Super Rugby AU. 

The captain's challenge law attracted widespread criticism, particularly after an incident in Munster's game against Cardiff where Munster's CJ Stander called for a captain's challenge on a Cardiff player returning the ball into a ruck, a minor technical offence. It was not adopted in subsequent tournaments.

World Rugby adopted the goal-line drop-out law more widely in the 2021–22 season and it has since become permanent.

Teams

PRO14 Rainbow Cup

PRO14 Rainbow Cup SA

Tables

PRO14 Rainbow Cup
All kickoff times are local.
League stage

Round 1

Round 2

Round 3

Round 4

Round 5

Round 6

PRO14 Rainbow Cup SA
All kickoff times are local.
League stage

Round 1

Round 2

Round 3

Round 4

Round 5

Round 6

Final
The first-placed teams from each tournament, Benetton and Bulls, played in the final in Treviso. Benetton won 35–8 in front of their home crowd for a historic first win of an international competition for any Italian club.

References

Notes

External links
Official website

 
2020–21 in European rugby union leagues
2020-21
2020–21 in Irish rugby union
2020–21 in Italian rugby union
2020–21 in Scottish rugby union
2020–21 in Welsh rugby union
2020 in South African rugby union
2021 in South African rugby union